Dávid Dombó (born 26 February 1993) is a Hungarian football player who plays for Vasas.

Club career
On 16 July 2016 he was signed by Nemzeti Bajnokság I club Mezőkövesdi SE.

On 21 June 2022, Dombó signed a three-year contract with Vasas.

Club statistics

Updated to games played as of 15 May 2021.

References

External links 

1993 births
People from Pápa
Sportspeople from Veszprém County
21st-century Hungarian people
Living people
Hungarian footballers
Hungary youth international footballers
Hungary under-21 international footballers
Association football goalkeepers
Szombathelyi Haladás footballers
Vác FC players
Mezőkövesdi SE footballers
SV Lafnitz players
Kisvárda FC players
Vasas SC players
Nemzeti Bajnokság I players
Nemzeti Bajnokság II players
Austrian Regionalliga players
Hungarian expatriate footballers
Expatriate footballers in Austria
Hungarian expatriate sportspeople in Austria